Roeper is a German name, and may refer to the following people:

 Annemarie Roeper, educator
 Bruno De Roeper, World War I flying ace
 Richard Roeper, film critic

Other 
 Roeper School, a school in Michigan, founded by Annemarie and George Roeper

See also 
 Roper (disambiguation)